Dōbutsu uranai (動物占い in Japanese) or zoological fortune-telling is a recent Japanese divination trend based on an animal horoscope.  Each person is categorized into an animal-type based on their birthdate, and based on their animal-type they are supposed to have certain personality traits.  There are four categories of animals, each representing a position on two axes: self-centered vs. mindful of others and focused vs. easily distracted.

Animal groups
Earth group: (self-centered, focused)
Tiger
Wolf
Monkey
Koala
Sun group: (self-centered, easily distracted)
Pegasus
Elephant
Lion
Cheetah
Full moon group: (mindful of others, focused)
Sheep
Panther
New moon group: (mindful of others, easily distracted)
Fawn
Tanuki (raccoon dog)

Divination
Animals in religion